Brú is a farmstead and road junction in northwestern Iceland in Vestur-Húnavatnssýsla county. It is located in the Northwest Political constituency. It has a filling station and a guesthouse.
It is located at the southern tip of Hrútafjörður where the river Hrútafjarðará has its estuary with the Arctic Ocean.

References

Populated places in Iceland